Haroon Rahim and Erik van Dillen were the defending champions but only Van Dillen competed that year with Dick Crealy.

Crealy and Van Dillen lost in the quarterfinals to Brian Gottfried and Raúl Ramírez.

Gottfried and Ramírez won in the final 6–3, 6–0 against Ricardo Cano and Víctor Pecci.

Seeds

Draw

Finals

Top half

Bottom half

External links
 1976 Volvo International Doubles draw

Doubles